Clavaria globospora is a species of coral fungus in the family Clavariaceae. It was first formally described as a new species by American mycologist Calvin Henry Kauffman in 1928. The type was collected by Kauffman at Lake Quinault in Washington. He noted that the fungus grew on very rotten conifer wood in swampy forest. The species name globospora derives from its spherical ("globose") spores, which measure 5–6 μm.

References

Clavariaceae
Fungi described in 1928
Fungi of North America
Taxa named by Calvin Henry Kauffman